The First K. Karunakaran Ministry (25 March 1977 – 25 April 1977) was a short-lived ministry of the Kerala Legislative Assembly led by Indian National Congress Leader K. Karunakaran that lasted for a mere 32 days.

K. Karunakaran took charge as the Chief Minister of Kerala on 25 March 1977. However, he tendered his resignation on 25 April 1977, following certain references by the Kerala High Court in what came to be known as the Rajan case.

Upon resignation, he was replaced by A. K. Antony as the Chief Minister.

Ministers

References 

Karunakaran 01
Indian National Congress state ministries
Indian National Congress of Kerala
1977 establishments in Kerala
1977 disestablishments in India
Cabinets established in 1977
Cabinets disestablished in 1977